Oakhurst is an American bluegrass-rock band from Denver, Colorado. Founded by bassist Johnny James Qualley and singer Adam Patrick Hill in 1999, Oakhurst became a full-time nationally touring act in 2004 and has produced five records. Their most recent album is Barrel (2012) which was produced in Nashville, Tennessee by Joe Pisapia. The band spikes traditional bluegrass with rock & roll and a kamikaze rhythmic sensibility.

Awards
On June 28, 2007, Oakhurst was voted Best Bluegrass Band in Colorado by Denver Westword magazine.

Personnel

Current members
A.P. Hill - Acoustic Guitar & Vocals
Johnny James Qualley - Doghouse & Electric Bass
Michael Colón - Drums & Percussion
Matthew Cooper - Banjo & Vocals
Chuck Hugenberg - Fiddle, Mandolin, & Vocals

Past members
Todd Hoefen ('99 - '04) *Andrew Clapp ('04 - '05) * Chris Budin ('05 - '12) - Drums
Ray Foss ('02 - '04) - Piano
Adam Smith - ('03 - '09) - Mandolin & Electric Guitar
Max Paley - ('09 - '15) - Mandolin, Electric Guitar & Vocals
Zach Daniels - ('04 - '11) Banjo, Electric Guitar, & Vocals
Daniel Lawrence Walker ('11 - '13) - Slide Guitar & Vocals
Ed Caner (at Wakarusa Festivals, a cruise or two, and South Dakota Venues) - Fiddle & Viola

Discography

Loose & Prosperous (2001)
River & Sticks
Punch Me
Speak
Loose & Prosperous
Hands Tucked
Djibouti
Trenchina
Greenhorn (2004)
Leslie's
Give
Sweet Carolina
Linger
Change
Four-Twenty
Circles
Dual Mono (2005)
Gypsies at JR's
Moonshine Still
Arkansas River
Brigade
Eggs On my Face
Grass is Greener
Dance Around
River and Sticks
Chili
Hit The Road
Kooky-Eyed Fox
Olivine
Can't Wait
Say Hello
Jump in the Getdown (2008) 
Down the Lane
Huckleberry Strangler
Get Down
Passing Through
Love Law & Pain
Bitterroot Hop
Close Your Eyes
Soon As The Sun
Crazy
Run Run Run
Heart String
Barrel (2012)
Please
Out West
I'll Be Alright
Barrel
Promises
Hallelu
Hartford
Sunshine
Surrender
Toast
Time To Change
Everlovin' Born
Bonus track: Satellites

References

External links

Oakhurst collection at Internet Archive's live music archive
Westword article "Hootennany" written by John La Briola

American bluegrass music groups
Musical groups from Denver
Musical groups established in 1999
1999 establishments in Colorado